The Spanish Socialist Workers' Party of the Community of Madrid (PSOE–M), from 2004 to 2015 the Socialist Party of Madrid (PSM–PSOE) and previously the Madrilenian Socialist Federation, is the branch of the Spanish Socialist Workers' Party (PSOE) in the Madrid region.

Electoral performance

Assembly of Madrid

Cortes Generales

European Parliament

Leadership since 1977 
The list of leaders of the PSOE regional party branches in Madrid since 1977 is as follows:
 Alonso Puerta (1977–1979)
 Joaquín Leguina (1979–1991)
 Teófilo Serrano (1991–1994)
 Jaime Lissavetzky (1994–2000)
 Rafael Simancas (2000-2007)
 Caretaker commission presided by Cristina Narbona (June–July 2007)
 Tomás Gómez (2007–2015)
 Caretaker commission presided by Rafael Simancas (February–July 2015)
 Sara Hernández (2015–2017)
 José Manuel Franco (2017–2021)
Juan Lobato (2021–present)

2021 primary election 
Following the party's bad results at the 2021 regional election, José Manuel Franco handed in his resignation as Secretary-General in May 2021. The PSOE's federal executive committee ensuingly appointed a PSOE–M managing committee led by Isaura Leal. Three pre-candidates tried to collect enough endorsements to run in the primary election to the post of Secretary–General: Eva Llarandi (PSOE's Secretary General in Paracuellos), Javier Ayala (Mayor of Fuenlabrada), and Juan Lobato (former Mayor of Soto del Real).

References

1879 establishments in Spain
Madrid
Political parties established in 1879
Political parties in the Community of Madrid
Social democratic parties in Spain